Antje Döll (née Lauenroth, born 3 October 1988) is a German handballer for SG BBM Bietigheim and the German national team.

Achievements
Bundesliga:
Winner: 2017, 2019, 2022
IHF Junior World Championship:
Winner: 2008
EHF European League:
Winner: 2022

References

External links

1988 births
Living people
German female handball players
People from Haldensleben
Sportspeople from Saxony-Anhalt